Aamna Sharif (born 16 July 1982) is an Indian television actress known for portraying Kashish in Kahiin to Hoga , Muskan in Hongey Judaa Na Hum and Komolika Chaubey Basu in Kasautii Zindagii Kay 2.

Early life and education
Aamna Sharif was born on 16 July 1982 in Mumbai, Maharashtra to an Indian father and a Persian-Bahraini mother. She studied at St. Anne's High School, Bandra.

Personal life
In 2012, Sharif revealed that she suffers from acrophobia since childhood. After dating for almost a year, Sharif married her film distributor-turned-producer boyfriend Amit Kapoor, on 27 December 2013. The couple had their first child a boy born on 2 September 2015. They named that son as Arain Kapoor.

Career
During her second year in college, Sharif started receiving offers for modelling of various brands. Sharif started her career through featuring in music videos. Sharif made her acting debut as Kashish Sinha in Kahiin to Hoga opposite Rajeev Khandelwal. From 2012 to 2013, she played Muskaan Mishra in Sony TV's Hongey Judaa Na Hum opposite Raqesh Vashisth.

Shariff made her film debut with the 2009 Bollywood film Aloo Chaat opposite Aftab Shivdasani. In the same year, she also starred in Aao Wish Karein, with Shivdasani again. In 2014, she appeared in Mohit Suri's Ek Villain. However, none of the films gained her recognition making her return to television in 2012 with Hongey Judaa Na Hum.

In 2019, Sharif made her television comeback after six years with StarPlus's Kasautii Zindagii Kay where she plays the antagonist Komolika Basu replacing Hina Khan.

Filmography

Television

Films

Web series

Music videos

Awards and nominations

See also 

List of Indian television actresses
List of Hindi television actresses
 List of Indian film actresses

References

External links 

 
 

Living people
Actresses from Mumbai
Indian soap opera actresses
Indian television actresses
Indian film actresses
Indian people of Bahraini descent
Indian people of Iranian descent
21st-century Indian actresses
1982 births
Actors from Mumbai
Converts to Hinduism
Converts to Hinduism from Islam
Indian former Muslims